Mahammad Muradli (born 1 August 2003) is an Azerbaijani chess grandmaster (GM) and a two-time national champion.

Career 
Mahammad Muradli won the U12 section in the 2015 World Youth Chess Championship.

He played for Azerbaijan-3 team in the Chess Olympiad:
 In 2016, at third board in the 42nd Chess Olympiad in Baku (+2, =0, -3).

In 2019, Muradli played for Azerbaijan team in World Youth Chess Olympiad and the team became an Olympic champion.

In 2019 and 2022 Muradli won Azerbaijani championship.

In July 2022, Muradli won the 2022 Biel MTO edition with a score of 7.0/9 and a rating performance of 2726.

References

External links

Mahammad Muradli chess games at 365Chess.com
Mahammad Muradli chess games at Chess.com

2003 births
Living people
Azerbaijani chess players
Chess Olympiad competitors
Chess grandmasters
World Youth Chess Champions